Woodrow is an unincorporated community in the Canadian province of Saskatchewan approximately 6 miles west of Lafleche. This present day agricultural area was once the hub of the local area with lumber yards, grain elevators, 3 churches and 3 or more general stores. The village was formally dissolved on March 21, 2002, and is now administered by the surrounding Rural Municipality of Wood River No. 74.

Demographics 

Transportation 
Saskatchewan Transportation Company provided intercity bus service until the end of May, 2017, when service was discontinued.

Churches 
The  Woodrow Gospel Chapel began service in 1909 by George Reimche, and was based on immigrants from North Dakota when the community was originally known as Hoffnungsfeld.

Climate

See also 
 List of communities in Saskatchewan

References 

Wood River No. 74, Saskatchewan
Designated places in Saskatchewan
Former villages in Saskatchewan
Unincorporated communities in Saskatchewan
Populated places disestablished in 2002